Boulsa is the capital of Namentenga Province in Burkina Faso.  It is predominantly Mossi with small populations of Fula and Gulmanche peoples.

Education 
Le Lycée Provincial de Boulsa is the main high school catering to approximately 1300 students (2008).  The Collège d'Ensignment Technique Professionnelle de Boulsa, Collège Gues-Wende and a Catholic CEG also provide 6ème through 3ème.  There are also several primary schools.

Economy 
Market day occurs every three days regardless of the day of the week. It is host to a regional office for Plan International.

Notable people 
 Pierre Sandwidi – singer and musician

References

Populated places in the Centre-Nord Region
Namentenga Province